The Cooley Covered Bridge is a covered bridge that carries Elm Street across Furnace Brook in Pittsford, Vermont.  Built in 1849, it is one of a small number of bridges in the state that has a well-documented association with the 19th-century master bridgewright Nicholas M. Powers, who grew up nearby.  It is one of four surviving 19th-century covered bridges in the town, and was listed on the National Register of Historic Places in 1974.

Description and history
The bridge originally rested on stone abutments, which have either been rebuilt or faced in concrete. It has a slate roof. The sides are sheathed in vertical board siding, which extends around the portal ends and partly to the inside of the structure. Portions of the trusses have been reinforced by doubling the timbers, and some iron bracing has been added to the bridge's underside.

The bridge was built in 1849 by Nicholas M. Powers, who was born a farm not far from here.  It is one of four bridges whose construction is known to have been executed or overseen by Powers, acknowledged as the state's best-known builder of covered bridges.  It is also one of just four covered bridges in the town.

See also
National Register of Historic Places listings in Rutland County, Vermont
List of bridges on the National Register of Historic Places in Vermont
List of Vermont covered bridges

References

Covered bridges on the National Register of Historic Places in Vermont
Buildings and structures completed in 1849
Covered bridges in Rutland County, Vermont
Buildings and structures in Pittsford, Vermont
National Register of Historic Places in Rutland County, Vermont
Road bridges on the National Register of Historic Places in Vermont
Wooden bridges in Vermont
Lattice truss bridges in the United States